The Third cabinet of Napoleon III was formed by the Emperor Napoleon III on 2 December 1852, replacing the Second cabinet of Louis Napoleon at the start of the  Second French Empire. It remained in place (with various ministerial changes) until 17 July 1869, when it was replaced by the Fourth cabinet of Napoleon III. The ministers were each accountable to Napoleon III, who was thus both head of state and head of government.

Ministerial appointments were:

References

French governments
1852 establishments in France
1869 disestablishments in France
Cabinets established in 1852
Cabinets disestablished in 1869
Napoleon III